The Gara Ciclistica Montappone was a one-day road cycling race held annually in Italy. It was part of UCI Europe Tour as a category 1.2 event from 2005 to 2010.

Winners

References

Cycle races in Italy
UCI Europe Tour races
Recurring sporting events established in 1990
Recurring sporting events disestablished in 2011
1990 establishments in Italy
2011 disestablishments in Italy
Defunct cycling races in Italy